Oonopinus is a spider genus in the family Oonopidae.

Species  
 Oonopinus angustatus (Simon, 1882) — Spain, France, Corsica, Algeria
 Oonopinus argentinus Birabén, 1955 — Argentina
 Oonopinus aurantiacus Simon, 1893 — Venezuela
 Oonopinus bistriatus Simon, 1907 — Sierra Leone
 Oonopinus centralis Gertsch, 1941 — Panama
 Oonopinus corneus Tong & Li, 2008 — China
 Oonopinus ionicus Brignoli, 1979 — Greece
 Oonopinus kilikus Suman, 1965 — Seychelles, Hawaii
 Oonopinus modestus Chickering, 1951 — Panama
 Oonopinus oceanicus Marples, 1955 — Samoa, Niue
 Oonopinus pilulus Suman, 1965 — China, Hawaii
 Oonopinus pretiosus Bryant, 1942 — Virgin Islands
 Oonopinus pruvotae Berland, 1929 — New Caledonia

See also 
 List of Oonopidae species

References

External links 

Oonopidae
Araneomorphae genera
Spiders of Asia
Spiders of South America
Spiders of Central America